Gerald J. Meyer is an active researcher and professor of inorganic chemistry at the University of North Carolina at Chapel Hill. He was previously the  Bernard N. Baker Chair In Chemistry at Johns Hopkins University. His research interests include inorganic photochemistry with emphasis on solar energy, using interfacial electron transfer processes  
and dye-sensitized solar cells.

Education
Meyer earned a B.S. in chemistry from the University at Albany, SUNY in 1985.
In 1989 he earned his Ph.D. in chemistry at the University of Wisconsin–Madison, where he worked with Arthur B. Ellis.
From 1989-1991, he did postdoctoral work at the  University of North Carolina at Chapel Hill with Thomas J. Meyer.

Career 
In 1991, Meyer joined Johns Hopkins University. Meyer was a director of the NSF Collaborative Research Activities in Environmental Science Center (CRAEMS) from 2002-2007. Meyer held the Bernard N. Baker Chair In Chemistry at Johns Hopkins University from 2009 to 2013, and served as Chairman of the chemistry department at Johns Hopkins University from 2011 to 2013. 

As of January 2014, he became Professor in Chemistry at the University of North Carolina at Chapel Hill.  He is the Director of the University of North Carolina's Center for Solar Fuels (UNC EFRC), an Energy Frontier Research Center funded by the United States Department of Energy.

He has served on the Editorial Advisory Boards of the American Chemical Society journals Langmuir, Inorganic Chemistry, Chemistry of Materials. He is the Associate Editor of ACS Applied Materials & Interfaces (introduced in 2008) and the Deputy Editor of ACS Applied Energy Materials (introduced in 2018).

Patents
 Chemical Sensing with Photoluminescent Semiconductor Materials.  Meyer, G.J.; Lisensky, G.C.; Ellis, A.B. Serial No. 4,752,588. issued 1988.
 Solar Cells Incorporating Light Harvesting Arrays.  Meyer, G.J.; Lindsey, J.S. Serial No. 6,596,935  issued 2003.

References

Year of birth missing (living people)
Living people
21st-century American chemists
Johns Hopkins University faculty
University of Wisconsin–Madison College of Letters and Science alumni
University of North Carolina at Chapel Hill faculty